Yan Klukowski (born 1 January 1987) is an English professional footballer who plays as a midfielder for Hereford where he is also serving as a manager.

Club career

Youth and College
Born and raised in Chippenham, Wiltshire, Klukowski was educated at Sheldon School. His football education began at local club Chippenham Town before moving to Bath City. At 18 years of age, he broke into the first team at Bath. Klukowski turned down a new contract with Bath in July 2005 to sign a four-year scholarship with Central Connecticut State University (CCSU) in New Britain, Connecticut, United States. He had a brief stint with Chippenham Town at the start of the 2005–06 season before starting his scholarship.

At CCSU, Klukowski was the Northeast Conference Rookie of the Year, playing for the All Conference first team. He was named to the All-NEC first team and received second team NSCAA All-North Atlantic Region honors as a sophomore in 2006. From December 2006 to January 2007, Klukowski played with Chippenham Town, while on holiday from the United States. In 2007, he led the NEC in assists and was named to the All-NEC second team and the NSCAA All-North Atlantic Region first team.

During his college years, Klukowski also played with Ottawa Fury and the Cape Cod Crusaders in the USL Premier Development League.

Professional
Klukowski turned professional in 2009 and joined the Western Mass Pioneers of the USL Second Division, where he played 12 times, scoring once in a 2–1 win over Wilmington Hammerheads. He was the joint seventh highest assist provider in the 2009 USL Second Division, with five.

Following the conclusion of the season, Klukowski returned to England in an attempt to find a professional club to play for during 2009–10 and beyond. His first trial was provided by Carlisle United who were originally impressed and extended his trial period before deciding against offering him a contract. Klukowski then went on trial with Swindon Town, but was not offered a contract. In August 2009, Klukowski rejoined Chippenham Town. He later joined Larkhall Athletic until the end of 2009–10, scoring six goals from eight league appearances. In June 2010, he returned to Bath City on trial in an attempt to earn a contract following their promotion into the Conference Premier.

In July 2010, he went on trial with Forest Green Rovers, before joining the Conference Premier club on 13 August. He scored his first goal for the club in August 2010 in only his second appearance against Wrexham. On 21 January 2011, he was awarded a new contract until the end of 2011–12 by Forest Green, after a number of impressive appearances. After suffering an injury in the latter months of 2010–11, Klukowski was required to have surgery and returned to first-team action at the start of 2011–12. He scored his first goal of the season in a 6–1 away win over Alfreton Town on 20 August 2011, after converting James Rowe's cross. On 31 March 2012, in a home match against Barrow, Klukowski scored his first hat-trick for Forest Green. Klukowski ended 2011–12 as Forest Green's top scorer with 18 goals from 45 appearances.

On 12 June 2012, Klukowski signed a contract extension at Forest Green, keeping him at the club until 2014. On 15 April 2014, two goals in a 2–1 away win over Macclesfield Town saw him overtake Alex Meechan as Forest Green's all-time leading Conference Premier goal scorer, a record that has since been beaten, with a total of 48 league goals for the club. On 28 April 2014, it was revealed that he had turned down the offer of a new contract with Forest Green in the hope he could earn a deal with a Football League club.

On 20 May 2014, Klukowski joined League Two club Newport County on a two-year contract. He made his debut for Newport on the opening day of 2014–15 against Wycombe Wanderers on 9 August 2014 as a second-half substitute. His first goal for Newport came in a 2–1 home defeat against Swindon Town on 23 September 2014 in the first round of the Football League Trophy, with a tap-in from Aaron O'Connor's pass. He was released by Newport on 10 May 2016 at the end of his contract.

On 28 June 2016, Klukowski joined newly relegated National League club York City on a two-year contract. On 21 May 2017, he started as York beat Macclesfield Town 3–2 at Wembley Stadium in the 2017 FA Trophy Final.

On 29 June 2017, Klukowski signed for National League club Torquay United on a contract of undisclosed length, having been allowed to leave York despite having a year left on his contract. He joined National League North club Kidderminster Harriers on 17 November 2017 on a one-month loan.

He was released by Torquay at the end of the 2017–18 season.

On 22 May 2018, Klukowski signed for National League South side Chippenham Town,

Klukowski left the Bluebirds on 17 September 2019. On 27 September, he then joined Hungerford Town.

On 15 July 2020, Klukowski signed for Hereford. On 5 February 2023, following the departure of manager Josh Gowling, Klukowski was appointed interim manager having already been serving as assistant manager.

International career
Klukowski scored with a 35-yard shot on his debut for England schools, in a 3–0 away win over Scotland on 25 February 2005. He represented Great Britain at World University Games in Bangkok, Thailand in 2006. He was also selected to represent the Great Britain university football team at the 2007 Summer Universiade.

Personal life
Klukowski is of Polish descent, through his grandfather.

Career statistics

Managerial statistics

Honours
York City
FA Trophy: 2016–17

References

External links

Yan Klukowski profile at the Torquay United F.C. website
Yan Klukowski profile at the Kidderminster Harriers F.C. website

1987 births
Living people
People from Chippenham
Footballers from Wiltshire
English footballers
English expatriate footballers
England schools international footballers
Association football midfielders
Chippenham Town F.C. players
Bath City F.C. players
Central Connecticut Blue Devils men's soccer players
Ottawa Fury (2005–2013) players
Cape Cod Crusaders players
Western Mass Pioneers players
Larkhall Athletic F.C. players
Forest Green Rovers F.C. players
Newport County A.F.C. players
York City F.C. players
Torquay United F.C. players
Kidderminster Harriers F.C. players
Hungerford Town F.C. players
Southern Football League players
USL League Two players
USL Second Division players
Western Football League players
National League (English football) players
English Football League players
Expatriate soccer players in the United States
People educated at Sheldon School
English expatriate sportspeople in the United States
English people of Polish descent
English expatriate sportspeople in Canada
Expatriate soccer players in Canada
English football managers
Hereford F.C. managers